Remington Vernam may refer to:
Remington D. B. Vernam, World War I flying ace
Remington Vernam (land developer), founder of the neighborhood of Arverne, Queens in the Rockaway Peninsula of New York City